Michel Jean Pierre Verne (August 3, 1861 – March 5, 1925) was a writer, editor, and the son of Jules Verne.

Michel was born in Paris, France.  Because of his wayward behaviour, he was sent by his father to Mettray Penal Colony for six months in 1876. By the age of 19, he caused a scandal by eloping with an actress despite his famous father's objections. By 1883 his father finally came around and Michel got married—only to abandon his newlywed wife and run away with 16-year-old Jeanne Reboul, with whom he had two children before his divorce got finalized. These and other issues caused much strain between Michel and his father, but by the time Jules died in 1905 relations between them had improved, and they had collaborated on some stories.

Michel was in charge of publishing many of his father's last manuscripts, and it is rumored that Michel may have written some of them himself. Works previously attributed to Jules Verne but now considered to have been written by Michel include The Lighthouse at the End of the World, The Golden Volcano (in two parts, Claim on Forty Mile Creek and Flood and Flame) and The Thompson Travel Agency. Michel Verne wrote in a similar genre to his father, and was considered by his father to be a good writer, but his works are now generally considered to be inferior to those of his father.

Some of his works, like Un Express de L'Avenir and In the Year 2889 are notable for their use of pneumatic tubes.

Works by Michel Verne
La Destinée de Jean Morénas
L'Éternel Adam (The Eternal Adam, Short Story)
Un Express de L'Avenir
A Great Transatlantic Subway (Short Story)
In the Year 2889
Survivors of the Jonathan (published in two parts in English as Masterless Man and Unwilling Dictator)

External links

Verne Title Listing (Including Works by Michel Verne)
An Express of the Future (Short story, originally published as by Jules Verne due to an editorial error)
 
 

1861 births
1925 deaths
Writers from Paris
Jules Verne
19th-century French novelists
20th-century French novelists
French science fiction writers